Guillermo Arriaga Fernández (July 4, 1926 – January 3, 2014) was a Mexican dancer, choreographer and composer.

In 1996, he received the José Limón National Dance Award.

Guillermo Arriaga Fernández died from pneumonia on January 3, 2014, aged 87, in his hometown of Mexico City.

References

1926 births
2014 deaths
People from Mexico City
Mexican male dancers
Mexican choreographers
Mexican composers
Mexican male composers
Deaths from pneumonia in Mexico
20th-century Mexican dancers
21st-century Mexican dancers
20th-century Mexican musicians
21st-century Mexican musicians
20th-century composers
21st-century composers
20th-century male musicians
21st-century male musicians